Northwest R-I School District is a school district located in Jefferson County, Missouri serving High Ridge, Dittmer, House Springs, Cedar Hill and a portion of Fenton.

About
Northwest R-I ranks 27th out of 562 school districts in the state of Missouri in terms of student body population. 93% of the student body is White. 91% of students of Northwest R-I graduate from high school. The average ACT score is 20 falling almost a point below the Missouri average as of the 2017 school year.

History
In 2017 the district had 6,300 students. Desi Kirchofer became superintendent in 2017. 
With a vote of 7-0, the Northwest R-1 Board of Education voted Dr. Jennifer Hecktor to become the new superintendent on July 1, 2022 following Dr.Kirchofer's retirement on May 31, 2022.

List of schools

Pre-K 
Northwest Early Child Center

Elementary schools 
Brennan Woods Elementary
Cedar Springs Elementary
High Ridge Elementary
Maple Grove Elementary
Murphy Elementary
House Springs Elementary

Middle schools 
Woodridge Middle School
Northwest Valley Middle School

High schools 
Northwest High School

References

Buildings and structures in Jefferson County, Missouri
Education in Jefferson County, Missouri